Johnny's New Kingdom is a British television series presented by wildlife cameraman Johnny Kingdom. 10 episodes were first shown on BBC Two in March and April 2008.

External links
 

Reviews

BBC Television shows
2008 British television series debuts
2008 British television series endings